The list of high schools in Istanbul lists high schools within the city limits of Istanbul.

Adalar 

 Heybeliada Anadolu Lisesi
 Heybeliada Deniz Lisesi

 Heybeliada Hüseyin Rahmi Gürpınar Çok Programlı Lisesi
 Özel Heybeliada Rum Erkek Lisesi

Arnavutköy 

 Arnavutköy Bolluca Ticaret Meslek Lisesi
 Arnavutköy Kız Meslek ve Teknik Meslek Lisesi
 Bolluca İMKB Ticaret Meslek Lisesi
 Durusu Hüseyin Ökten Lisesi
 Hadımköy İbrahim Özaydın Çok Programlı Lisesi 
 Hadımköy Örfi Çetinkaya Anadolu Lisesi

 Hadımköy TOKİ Lisesi
 Haraççı İMKB Lisesi
 İstanbul Spor Lisesi
 Mehmet Akif Ersoy Lisesi
 Örfi Çetinkaya Anadolu Teknik ve Endüstri Meslek Lisesi
 Taşoluk Anadolu Lisesi

Ataşehir 

 Dilek Sabancı Anadolu Ticaret Meslek Lisesi 
 Dr. Nurettin Erk-Perihan Erk Endüstri Meslek Lisesi
 Esatpaşa Anadolu İmam Hatip Lisesi ve İmam Hatip Lisesi
 Esatpaşa Anadolu Ticaret ve Ticaret Meslek Lisesi  
 Habire Yahşi Anadolu Lisesi 
 İstanbul Güzel Sanatlar ve Spor Lisesi 
 Mehmet Rauf Lisesi 
 Mevlana Kız Teknik ve Meslek Lisesi 
 Mustafa Kemal Anadolu Lisesi 
 Nuri Cıngıllıoğlu Lisesi 

 Özel Ataşehir Adıgüzel Bilişim Teknik Lisesi
 Özel Ataşehir Adıgüzel Güzel Sanatlar Lisesi
 Özel Bostancı Akşam Lisesi 
 Özel Bostancı Doğa Anadolu Lisesi 
 Özel Bostancı Güneş Lisesi 
 Özel Fenerbahçe Spor Kulübü Anadolu Lisesi 
 Prof. Faik Somer Anadolu Lisesi 
 Remzi Bayraktar Anadolu Ticaret ve Ticaret Meslek Lisesi 
 TEB Ataşehir Anadolu Lisesi 
 Yeditepe Özel Eğitim Meslek Lisesi

Avcılar 

 50. Yıl İnsa Lisesi
 Avcılar Lisesi
 Avcılar Ticaret Meslek Lisesi
 Endüstri Meslek Lisesi
 Gümüşpala Lisesi
 İBB Şehit Şerife Bacı Lisesi

 İHKİB Hazır Giyim ve Konfeksiyon Meslek Lisesi
 Mehmet Baydar Anadolu Lisesi
 Mehmet Emin Horoz Lojistik Meslek Lisesi
 Özel Okyanus Lisesi
 Saide Zorlu Ticaret Meslek Lisesi ve Anadolu Ticaret Meslek Lisesi
 Süleyman Nazif Anadolu Lisesi

Bağcılar 

 Abdurrahman ve Nermin Bilimli Anadolu Teknik ve Endüstri Meslek Lisesi
 Alaattin - Nilüfer Kadayıfçıoğlu Kız Teknik ve Meslek Lisesi
 Bağcılar Ahi Evren Anadolu İmam Hatip Lisesi
 Bağcılar Akşemsettin Anadolu Lisesi
 Bağcılar Lisesi
 Bağcılar Teknik ve Endüstri Meslek Lisesi
 Bağcılar Ticaret Meslek Lisesi
 Barbaros Anadolu Lisesi
 Dr. Kemal Naci Ekşi Anadolu Lisesi
 Dündar Uçar Lisesi
 Gazi kız meslek ve teknik Lisesi
 Hikmet Nazif Kurşunoğlu Kız Teknik ve Meslek Lisesi
 İbni Sina Anadolu Lisesi

 Mahmutbey Lisesi
 Mehmet Niyazı Altuğ Anadolu Lisesi
 Orhan Gazi Lisesi
 Osmangazi Lisesi
 Otocenter Ticaret Meslek Lisesi
 Özel Bağcılar Birikim Koleji
 Özel Bağcılar Ensar Koleji
 Özel Cihangir Lisesi
 Özel Gökşen Akşam Lisesi
 Özel Gökşen Lisesi
 Özel Güneşli Okyanus Lisesi
 Yavuz Sultan Selim Lisesi
 Yunus Emre Ticaret Meslek Lisesi

Bahçelievler 
 Adnan Menderes Anadolu Lisesi
 Bahçelievler Anadolu Lisesi
 Bahçelievler Cumhuriyet Anadolu Lisesi
 Bahçelievler Necip Fazıl Kısakürek Lisesi
 Dede Korkut Anadolu Lisesi
 İstanbul Sosyal Bilimler Lisesi
 İstanbul Fatih Fen Lisesi
 Kemal Hasoğlu Lisesi

Bakırköy 

 Ataköy Cumhuriyet Anadolu Lisesi
 Ataköy Lisesi
 Bakırköy Anadolu Kız Meslek ve Kız Meslek Lisesi
 Bakırköy Anadolu Ticaret Meslek Lisesi ve Ticaret Meslek Lisesi
 Bakırköy İmam Hatip Lisesi
 Bakırköy Lisesi
 Bakırköy 70. Yıl Anadolu Sağlık Meslek Lisesi
 Bakırköy Nüket Ercan Ticaret Meslek Lİsesi
 Gürlek-Nakipoğlu Anadolu Lisesi
 Hasan Polatkan Anadolu Lisesi
 İSTEK Özel Bilge Kağan Fen Lisesi
 İSTEK Özel Bilge Kağan Lisesi
 MEV Özel Basınköy Lisesi

 Özel Asır Lisesi
 Özel Bakırköy Akşam Lisesi
 Özel Bireysel Tercihim Akşam Lisesi
 Özel Florya Final Lisesi
 Özel Florya Koleji
 Özel Gökşen Akşam Lisesi
 Özel Kültür Fen Lisesi
 Özel Kültür Lisesi
 Sabri Çalışkan Lisesi
 Tevfik Ercan Anadolu Lisesi
 Yahya Kemal Beyatlı Anadolu Lisesi
 Yeşilköy 50. Yıl Lisesi
 Yeşilköy Anadolu Lisesi

Başakşehir 

 Altınşehir Lisesi
 Bahçeşehir Atatürk Anadolu Lisesi
 Bahçeşehir İMKB Teknik ve Endüstri Meslek Lisesi
 Başakşehir Lisesi
 Başakşehir Ticaret Meslek Lisesi
 Özel Akçınar Lisesi
 Özel Bahçeşehir Bilfen Anadolu Lisesi
 Özel Bahçeşehir Fen ve Teknoloji Lisesi
 Özel Bahçeşehir Lisesi
 Özel Başakşehir Burç Anadolu Lisesi

 Özel Başakşehir Burç Fen Lisesi
 Özel Başakşehir Ensar Anadolu Lisesi
 Özel Burç Güzel Sanatlar ve Spor Lisesi
 Özel Burç Ticaret ve Meslek Lisesi
 Özel Çınar Fen Lisesi
 Özel Çınar Lisesi
 Özel Yıldızlar Lisesi
 Özel Yıldızlar Meslek Lisesi
 Toki Kayaşehir Anadolu Lisesi
 Toki Kayaşehir Ticaret Meslek Lisesi

Bayrampaşa 

 Bayrampaşa Anadolu Ticaret ve Ticaret Meslek Lisesi
 Bayrampaşa Kız Teknik ve Meslek Lisesi
 Hüseyin Bürge Anadolu Lisesi
 İnönü Anadolu Teknik, Teknik ve Endüstri Meslek Lisesi
 İTO Anadolu Teknik ve Endüstri Meslek Lisesi
 Prof. Dr. İbrahim ve Feti Pirlepeli Teknik ve Endüstri Meslek Lisesi

 Rıfat Canayakın Lisesi
 Sabit Büyükbayrak Lisesi
 Sağmalcılar Anadolu Lisesi
 Şehit Büyükelçi İsmail Erez Endüstri Meslek Lisesi
 Suat Terimer Anadolu Lisesi
 Tuna Anadolu Sağlık Meslek Lisesi

Beşiktaş 

 Arnavutköy Korkmaz Yiğit Anadolu Lisesi
 Beşiktaş Anadolu Lisesi
 Beşiktaş Atatürk Anadolu Lisesi
 Bingül Erdem Lisesi
 Erhan Gedikbaşı Çok Programlı Lisesi
 Etiler Anadolu Otelcilik Turizm Meslek Lisesi
 Etiler Lisesi
 İSOV-Dinçkök Anadolu Teknik Lisesi
 İSTEK Özel Atanur Oğuz Anadolu Lisesi
 İSTEK Özel Atanur Oğuz Fen Lisesi
 Kabataş Erkek Lisesi
 Levent Kız Meslek Lisesi
 Mehmet Ali Büyükhanlı Ticaret Meslek Lisesi
 Ortaköy Zubeyde Hanım Anadolu Kız Meslek Lisesi

 Özel Ata Lisesi
 Özel BJK Lisesi
 Özel MEF Lisesi
 Özel MEF Uluslarası Lisesi
 Özel Şişli Terakki Lisesi
 Özel TUDEM Anadolu Otelcilik ve Turizm Meslek Lisesi
 Özel TÜRSAB İstanbul Anadolu Otelcilik ve Turizm Meslek Lisesi
 Özel Yeni Yıldız Lisesi
 Özel Yıldız Lisesi
 Rüştü Akın Anadolu Meslek Lisesi
 Sakıp Sabancı Anadolu Lisesi
 Ulus Özel Musevi Lisesi
 Yeni Levent Lisesi
 Ziya Kalkavan Anadolu Denizcilik Meslek Lisesi

Beykoz 

 Akbaba Ticaret Meslek Lisesi
 Anadoluhisarı Ticaret Meslek Lisesi
 Barbaros Hayrettin Paşa Denizcilik Meslek Lisesi
 Beykoz Anadolu Lisesi
 Beykoz İmam Hatip Lisesi
 Beykoz Kız Meslek Lisesi
 Beykoz Teknik ve Endüstri Meslek Lisesi

 Çavuşbaşı Çok Programlı Lisesi
 Celal Aras Anadolu Lisesi
 Fevzi Çakmak Lisesi
 Galip Öztürk Çok Programlı Lisesi
 Özel Acarkent Doğa Anadolu Lisesi
 Paşabahçe Ahmet Ferit İnal Anadolu Lisesi
 Ted İstanbul Koleji Vakfı Özel Lisesi

Beylikdüzü 

 75. Yıl Cumhuriyet Lisesi
 Beşir Balcıoğlu Anadolu Lisesi
 Beylikdüzü Anadolu İmam Hatip Lisesi
 Beylikdüzü Çok Programlı Lisesi
 Büyükşehir Hüseyin Yıldız Anadolu Lisesi

 Cahit Zarifoğlu Lisesi
 Gürpınar İMKB Teknik ve Endüstri Meslek Lisesi
 Gürpınar Lisesi
 Vali Muammer Güler Anadolu Öğretmen Lisesi
 Yaşar Acar Fen Lisesi

Beyoğlu 

 Ayşe Ege Anadolu Kız Meslek Lisesi
 Beyoğlu Anadolu İmam Hatip Lisesi
 Beyoğlu Anadolu Lisesi
 Beyoğlu Teknik ve Endüstri Meslek Lisesi
 Beyoğlu Ticaret Meslek Lisesi
 Dilnihat Özyeğin Anadolu Lisesi
 Fındıklı Lisesi
 Galatasaray Lisesi
 Güner Akın Lisesi
 İstanbul Atatürk Anadolu Lisesi
 İstanbul Atatürk Lisesi
 İstanbul Ticaret Odası Kız Teknik ve Meslek Lisesi
 Kabataş Ticaret Meslek Lisesi
 Kasımpaşa Çok Programlı Lisesi
 Özel Alman Lisesi

 Özel Esayan Ermeni Lisesi
 Özel Galileo Galilei İtalyan Lisesi
 Özel Getronagan Ermeni Lisesi
 Özel İtalyan Lisesi
 Özel Merkez Rum Lisesi
 Özel Opera Güzel Sanatlar Lisesi
 Özel Saint Benoit Fransız Lisesi
 Özel Sainte-Pulchérie Fransız Lisesi
 Özel Sankt Georg Avusturya Lisesi ve Ticaret Okulu
 Özel Tarhan Koleji
 Özel Tudem Akşam Lisesi
 Özel Tudem Anadolu Otelcilik ve Turizm Meslek Lisesi 
 Özel Zapyon Rum Lisesi
 Özel Zoğrafyon Rum Lisesi ve Ticaret Okulu
 Taksim Ticaret Meslek Lisesi

Büyükçekmece 

 Büyükçekmece Atatürk Anadolu Lisesi
 Büyükçekmece Kız Teknik ve Meslek Lisesi
 Büyükçekmece Lisesi
 Büyükçekmece Recep Güngör Lisesi
 Büyükçekmece Sağlık Meslek Lisesi
 Büyükçekmece Teknik ve Endüstri Meslek Lisesi
 Çakmaklı Cumhuriyet Anadolu Lisesi
 Çakmaklı Cumhuriyet Lisesi
 Doç. Dr. Burhan Bahriyeli Teknik ve Endüstri Meslek Lisesi
 Emlak Konut Mimar Sinan Anadolu Lisesi
 Gürpınar 80. Yıl Güzel Sanatlar ve Spor Lisesi
 Kamiloba Sudi Özkan Çok Programlı Lisesi
 Kumburgaz Mehmet Erçağ Ticaret Meslek Lis
 Kumburgaz Otelcilik ve Turizm Meslek Lisesi
 Özel Büyükçekmece Gurur Akşam Lisesi

 Özel Beykent Anadolu Lisesi
 Özel Beykent Fen Lisesi
 Özel Beykent Sosyal Bilimler Lisesi
 Özel Beylikdüzü Fatih Anadolu Lisesi
 Özel Beylikdüzü Fatih Fen Lisesi
 Özel Büyükçekmece Gurur Akşam Lisesi
 Özel Çağ Fatih Lisesi
 Özel Fatih Fen Lisesi
 Özel Fatih Lisesi
 Özel Kültür 2000 Lisesi
 Özel Mimar Sinan Lisesi
 Sudi Özkan Kız Teknik ve Meslek Lisesi
 Tepecik Hüsnü M.Özyeğin Lisesi
 Tepekent Anadolu Lisesi

Çatalca 

 Arif Nihat Asya Teknik Lise ve Endüstri Meslek Lisesi
 Binkılıç Çok Programlı Lisesi
 Çatalca Anadolu Lisesi
 Çatalca İmam Hatip Lisesi

 Çatalca Kız Meslek Lisesi
 İstanbul Ticaret Odası Çok Programlı Lisesi
 Karacaköy Çok Programlı Lisesi
 Kestanelik Çok Programlı Lisesi

Esenler 
 Amiral Vehbi Ziya Dümer Anadolu Lisesi
 Atışalanı Lisesi
 Esenler İmam Hatip Lisesi
 Esenler Kız Meslek Lisesi
 Esenler Teknik ve Endüstri Meslek Lisesi
 İbrahim Turhan Anadolu Lisesi

Esenyurt 
Ali Kul Çok Programlı Lisesi
Esenyurt Lisesi
Fatih Sultan Mehmet Lisesi
Halil Akkanat Çok Programlı Lisesi
Kıraç İMKB Anadolu Teknik Lisesi
Nakipoğlu Cumhuriyet Anadolu Lisesi
Nakipoğlu İmam Hatip Lisesi

Eyüp 
 Alibeyköy Anadolu Lisesi
 Alibeyköy Teknik ve Endüstri Meslek Lisesi
 Eyüp Anadolu Lisesi
 Eyüp Ticaret Meslek Lisesi
 Rami Atatürk Anadolu Lisesi
Phanar Ioakimio Greek High School for Girls (defunct)

Fatih 

 Ahmet Rasim Lisesi
 Alparslan Ticaret Meslek Lisesi
 Atatürk Çağdaş Yaşam Çok Programlı Lisesi
 Cağaloğlu Anadolu Kız Meslek Lisesi
 Cağaloğlu Anadolu Lisesi
 Cağaloğlu Anadolu Moda Tasarım Meslek Lisesi
 Çapa Fen Lisesi (Anadolu Öğretmen Lisesi)
 Çemberlitaş Anadolu Lisesi
 Cibali Lisesi
 Davutpaşa Lisesi
 Fatih Anadolu İmamhatip Lisesi
 Fatih Gelenbevi Anadolu Lisesi
 Fatih Kız Lisesi
 Fatih Ticaret Meslek Lisesi
 Fatih Vatan Lisesi
 İstanbul İmam Hatip Lisesi
 İstanbul Lisesi
 Kadırga Teknik Lisesi ve Endüstri Meslek Lisesi
 Kocamustafapaşa Lisesi

 Matbaa Meslek Lisesi
 Mimar Sinan İşitme Engelliler Lisesi
 Özel Akasya Lisesi
 Özel Fener Rum Lisesi
 Özel Görkem Anadolu Otelcilik ve Turizm Meslek Lisesi
 Özel İklim Lisesi
 Özel Oğuzkaan Lisesi
 Özel Sahakyan Nunyan Ermeni Lisesi
 Özel Sultan Fatih Fen Lisesi
 Özel Sultan Fatih Lisesi
 Pertevniyal Anadolu Lisesi
 Samiha Ayverdi Anadolu Lisesi
 Şehremini Anadolu Lisesi
 Selçuk Kız Anadolu Meslek Lisesi
 Sultan Ahmet Endüstri Meslek Lisesi
 Sultan Selim Kız Meslek Lisesi
 Sultanahmet Suphipaşa Ticaret Meslek Lisesi
 Vefa Lisesi

Gaziosmanpaşa 

 Behçet Canbaz Anadolu Lisesi
 Fahrettin Özüdoğru Ticaret ve Anadolu Ticaret Meslek Lisesi          
 Gaziosmanpaşa Anadolu Lisesi
 Kadri Yörükoğlu Lisesi
 Kardelen Lisesi
 Kazım Karabekir İmam Hatip Lisesi
 Küçükköy Anadolu Meslek Lisesi, Teknik Lise ve Endüstri Meslek Lisesi
 Küçükkoy İmam Hatip Lisesi ve Anadolu İ.H. Lisesi
 Küçükköy Kız Teknik, Anadolu Kız Meslek ve Kız Meslek Lisesi

 Mevlana Anadolu Lisesi
 Özel Gaziosmanpaşa Anadolu Sağlık Meslek Lisesi
 Özel Gaziosmanpaşa Şefkat Fen Lisesi
 Özel Gaziosmanpaşa Şefkat Lisesi
 Özel Gaziosmanpaşa Şefkat Meslek Lisesi
 Özel Mavigün Lisesi
 Plevne Anadolu Lisesi
 Vefa Poyraz Anadolu Lisesi

Güngören 
 Güngören İmam Hatip Ve Anadolu Lisesi
 Güngören İMKB Ticaret Meslek Lisesi
 Güngören İzzet Ünver Lisesi
 Güngören Teknik Ve Endüstri Meslek Lisesi
 Güngören Ticaret Meslek Lisesi
 Güngören Ticaret Ve Anadolu Lisesi

Kadıköy 

 50. Yıl Tahran Anadolu Lisesi
 Ahmet Sani Gezici Lisesi
 Erenköy Kız Anadolu Lisesi
 Fenerbahçe Anadolu Lisesi
 General Ali Rıza Ersin Teknik ve Endüstri Meslek Lisesi
 Gözcübaba Lisesi
 Göztepe İhsan Kurşunoğlu Anadolu Lisesi
 Hayrullah Kefoğlu Anadolu Lisesi
 İntaş (Mehmet Akif Ersoy) Lisesi
 İstanbul Atatürk Fen Lisesi
 İstanbul Avni Akyol Anadolu Güzel Sanatlar ve Spor Lisesi
 İSTEK Özel Acıbadem Fen Lisesi
 İSTEK Özel Semiha Şakir Fen Lisesi
 İÜ Devlet Konservatuarı Müzik ve Sahne Sanatları Lisesi
 Kadıköy Anadolu İmam Hatip Lisesi
 Kadıköy Anadolu Lisesi
 Kadıköy Dumlupınar Ticaret Meslek Lisesi
 Kadıköy Kız Teknik ve Meslek Lisesi
 Kadıköy Lisesi
 Kadıköy Ticaret Meslek Lisesi
 Kazım İşmen Anadolu Lisesi
 Kemal Atatürk Lisesi

 Kenan Evren Anadolu Lisesi
 Mehmet Beyazıt Anadolu Sağlık Meslek Lisesi
 Mustafa Saffet Anadolu Lisesi
 Özel Anakent Lisesi
 Özel Atacan Lisesi
 Özel Doğuş Anadolu Lisesi
 Özel Doğuş Fen Lisesi
 Özel Duru Akşam Lisesi
 Özel FMV Erenköy Işık Fen Lisesi
 Özel FMV Erenköy Işık Lisesi
 Özel Irmak Lisesi
 Özel İstanbul Çevre Lisesi
 Özel İSTEK Acıbadem Lisesi
 Özel İSTEK Semiha Şakir Lisesi  
 Özel Kadıköy Akşam Lisesi
 Özel Kadıköy Gökşen Akşam Lisesi
 Özel Kervan Akşam Lisesi
 Özel Moda Mimar Sinan Güzel Sanatlar Lisesi
 Özel Saint Joseph Fransız Lisesi
 Şenesenevler Mualla Selcanoğlu Lisesi
 Suadiye Hacı Mustafa Tarman Lisesi

Kâğıthane 

 Cengiz Han Anadolu Lisesi
 Cengiz Han Lisesi
 Ekrem Cevahir Çok Programlı Lisesi
 Gültepe Lisesi
 Gültepe Teknik Lise ve Endüstri Meslek Lisesi
 İTO Ticaret Meslek Lisesi ve Anadolu Ticaret Meslek Lisesi

 Kağıthane Anadolu Lisesi
 Kağıthane İHKİB Hazır Giyim Meslek Lisesi
 Kağıthane İmam Hatip Lisesi ve Anadolu İmam Hatip Lisesi
 Profilo Anadolu Teknik Lisesi 
 Seyrantepe Dr. Sadık Ahmet Lisesi
 Vali Hayri Kozakçıoğlu Ticaret Meslek Lisesi

Kartal 

 Burak Bora Anadolu Lisesi
 DİSK Tekstil Kız Teknik ve Meslek Lisesi
 Fatin Rüştü Zorlu Anadolu Lisesi
 Hacı Hatice Bayraktar Lisesi
 Hacı İsmail Gündoğdu Ticaret Meslek Lisesi
 İMKB Meslek Lisesi
 İstanbul Köy Hizmetleri Anadolu Lisesi
 İSTEK Özel Uluğbey Anadolu Lisesi
 İSTEK Özel Uluğbey Fen Lisesi
 Kartal Anadolu İmam Hatip Lisesi
 Kartal Anadolu Lisesi
 Kartal Anadolu Ticaret Meslek ve Ticaret Meslek Lisesi
 Medine Tayfur Sökmen Lisesi
 Mehmet Akif Ersoy Anadolu İmam-Hatip ve İmam-Hatip Lisesi
 Özel Ahmet Şimşek Anadolu Lisesi

 Özel Balkanlar Akşam Lisesi
 Özel Kartal Doğa Anadolu Lisesi
 Özel Kartal Yesevi Anadolu Sağlık Meslek Lisesi
 Özel Kıraç Lisesi
 Özel Yakacık Doğa Anadolu Lisesi
 Sabiha Gökçen Kız Teknik ve Meslek Lisesi
 Şehit Öğretmen Hüseyin Ağırman Teknik ve Endüstri Meslek Lisesi
 Semiha Şakir Anadolu Lisesi
 Süleyman Demirel Lisesi
 Türk Kızılayı Kartal Lisesi
 Vali Erol Çakır Ticaret Meslek Lisesi
 Yakacık Lisesi
 Yakacık Teknik ve Endüstri Meslek Lisesi
 Yüksel-İlhan Alanyalı Anadolu Öğretmen Lisesi

Küçükçekmece

Atakent İMKB Teknik ve Endüstri Meslek Lisesi
Atatürk Kız Teknik Ve Meslek Lisesi
Dr. Oktay Duran Teknik ve Endüstri Meslek Lisesi
Eşref Bitlis Kız Teknik ve Meslek Lisesi
Fahrettin Kerim Gökay Anadolu Lisesi
Gazi Anadolu Lisesi
Gülten Özaydın Ticaret Meslek Lisesi
Halkalı İMKB Kız Teknik ve Meslek Lisesi
Halkalı Ticaret Meslek Lisesi
Halkalı Toplu Konut Lisesi
İsmet Aktar Endüstri Meslek Lisesi
Kadriye Moroğlu Lisesi
Küçükçekmece Anadolu İmam Hatip Lisesi
Küçükçekmece Anadolu Lisesi
Küçükçekmece İMKB Otelcilik ve Turizm Meslek Lisesi

Küçükçekmece Teknik ve Endüstri Meslek Lisesi
Marmara Lisesi
Mustafa Barut Lisesi
Nahit Menteşe Teknik ve Endüstri Meslek Lisesi
Orhan Cemal Fersoy Lisesi
Özel Balkaya Anadolu Sağlık Meslek Lisesi
Prof. Dr. Sabahattin Zaim Anadolu Lisesi
Sefaköy Lisesi
Şehit Binbaşı Bedir Karabıyık Teknik ve Endüstri Meslek Lisesi
TASEV Ayakkabı Anadolu Teknik Lisesi, Anadolu Meslek Lisesi ve Meslek Lisesi
Toki Atakent Anadolu Sağlık Meslek Lisesi
TOKİ Halkalı Anadolu İmam Hatip Lisesi
Toki Halkalı Güneşparkevleri Ticaret Meslek Lisesi
Zehra Mustafa Dalgıç Ticaret Meslek Lisesi

Maltepe 

Anadolu Meslek Lisesi, Teknik Lise ve Endüstri Meslek Lisesi
Atilla Uras Lisesi
E.C.A. Elginkan Anadolu Lisesi
Ertuğrul Gazi Anadolu Lisesi
Halit Armay Lisesi
Handan Hayrettin Yelkikanat Anadolu Teknik Lisesi
Hasan Şadoğlu Lisesi 
Kadir Has Anadolu Lisesi
Küçükyalı Anadolu Teknik Lisesi
Maltepe Anadolu İmam Hatip ve İmam Hatip Lisesi
Maltepe Fen Lisesi
Maltepe Anadolu Meslek ve Meslek Lisesi
Maltepe Anadolu Ticaret ve Ticaret Meslek Lisesi
Mediha Engizer Kız Meslek Lisesi
Mehmet Salih Bal Ticaret Meslek Lisesi

Orhangazi Lisesi
Özel Dragos Anadolu Otelcilik ve Turizm Meslek Lisesi
Özel Günhan Koleji
Özel Kasımoğlu Coşkun Fen Lisesi
Özel Kasımoğlu Coşkun Lisesi
Özel Maltepe Coşkun Fen Lisesi
Özel Maltepe Coşkun Lisesi
Özel Maltepe Gökyüzü Fen Lisesi
Özel Maltepe Gökyüzü Lisesi
Özel Marmara Fen Lisesi
Özel Marmara Koleji
Özel Marmara Radyo-Televizyon ve Gazetecilik Anadolu Teknik Meslek Lisesi
Rezan Has Lisesi
Şehit Er Çağlar Mengü Lisesi

Pendik 
 Gülizar Zeki Obdan Anadolu Lisesi
 Halil Kaya Gedik Teknik ve Endüstri Meslek Lisesi
 Kırımlı Fazilet Olcay Anadolu Lisesi
 Pendik Anadolu İmam Hatip Lisesi
 Pendik Denizcilik Anadolu Meslek Lisesi
 Pendik Fatih Anadolu Lisesi
 Pendik Teknik ve Endüstri Meslek Lisesi
 Pendik Türk Telekom Teknik ve Endüstri Meslek Lisesi
 Pendik Yunus Emre Mesleki ve Teknik Anadolu Lisesi

Sancaktepe 

 75. Yıl DMO Teknik ve Endüstri Meslek Lisesi
 Aziz Bayraktar Anadolu İmam Hatip Lisesi
 Samandıra Lisesi
 Samandıra Teknik ve Endüstri Meslek Lisesi

 Sancaktepe Anadolu Lisesi
 Sarıgazi Ticaret Meslek Lisesi
 Tolga Çınar Kız Teknik ve Meslek Lisesi
 Yenidoğan Çok Programlı Lisesi

Sarıyer 

 Ali Akkanat Lisesi
 Anadolu İmam Hatip Lisesi
 Behçet Kemal Çağlar Lisesi
 British International School
 Cevat Koçak Ticaret Meslek Lisesi
 Firuzan Kemal Demironaran Lisesi
 Hüseyin Kalkavan Lisesi
 İstinye Lisesi
 İTÜ Geliştirme Vakfı Özel Ekrem Elginkan Lisesi
 Kız Meslek Lisesi
 Mehmet Şam Ticaret Meslek Lisesi
 Mustafa Kemal Anadolu Öğretmen Lisesi
 Ömer Sabancı Emirgan Lisesi
 Özel Ayazağa Işık Lisesi
 Özel Bahçeköy Açı Lisesi
 Özel Cent Lisesi

 Özel Darüşşafaka Lisesi
 Özel Doğa Lisesi
 Özel Enka Lisesi
 Özel Erol Altaca Anadolu Lisesi
 Özel Erol Altaca Lisesi
 Özel İSTEK Kemal Atatürk Lisesi
 Özel İstinye Ufuk Fen Lisesi
 Özel İstinye Ufuk Lisesi
 Tarabya British Schools (Özel Tarabya Anadolu Lisesi)
 Özel Tarabya Ufuk Lisesi
 Özel Yüzyıl Işıl Lisesi
 Rotary 100. Yıl Anadolu Lisesi
 Ş. Ülgezel Anadolu Meslek Lisesi
 Tarabya British Schools
 Vehbi Koç Vakfı Lisesi
 Yaşar Dedeman İmam Hatip Lisesi

Silivri 

 Değirmenköy Lisesi
 Gümüşyaka Anadolu Lisesi
 Hasan-Sabriye Gümüş Anadolu Lisesi
 İbrahim Yirik Lisesi
 Özel Balkan Lisesi
 Selimpaşa Atatürk Anadolu Lisesi
 Selimpaşa İmam Hatip Lisesi

 Şerife Baldöktü Kız Teknik ve Meslek Lisesi
 Selimpaşa İMKB Otelcilik ve Turizm Meslek Lisesi
 Silivri Anadolu Teknik, Teknik ve Endüstri Meslek Lisesi
 Silivri Lisesi
 Silivri Necip Sarıbekir Ticaret Meslek Lisesi
 Silivri Selimpaşa Fen Lisesi
 TOKİ Cumhuriyet Anadolu Lisesi

Şile 

 Ağva Lisesi
 Anadolu Öğretmen Lisesi
 Anadolu Otelcilik ve Turizm Meslek Lisesi
 Dr. Vasıf Topçu Fen Lisesi

 Şile Ağva Anadolu Lisesi
 Şile İMKB 50. Yıl Çok Programlı Lisesi
 Şile Kız Teknik ve Meslek Lisesi
 Şile Tekstil Meslek Lisesi

Şişli 

 Ahi Evran Ticaret Meslek Lisesi
 Ayazağa Lisesi
 Halil Rıfat Paşa Lisesi
 İSOV Teknik ve Endüstri Meslek Lisesi
 İtalyan Koleji
 Kurtuluş Lisesi
 Maçka Akif Tuncel Teknik ve Endüstri Meslek Lisesi
 Mecidiyeköy Lisesi
 Mehmet Pısak Lisesi
 Mehmet Rıfat Evyap Teknik ve Endüstri Meslek Lisesi
 Nişantaşı Anadolu Lisesi
 Nişantaşı Nuri Akın Anadolu Lisesi
 Nişantaşı Rüştü Uzel Kız Teknik ve Meslek Lisesi
 Özel Bilgi Türk Lisesi

 Özel Eşref Aydın Akşam Lisesi
 Özel Eşref Aydın Lisesi
 Özel FMV Işık Lisesi
 Özel Nilgün Doğay Lisesi
 Özel Notre Dame de Sion Fransız Lisesi
 Özel Pangaltı Ermeni Lisesi
 Özel Saint Michel Fransız Lisesi
 Şişli Anadolu Lisesi
 Şişli Lisesi
 Şişli Sağlık Meslek Lisesi
 Şişli Teknik ve Endüstri Meslek Lisesi
 Yunus Emre Lisesi

Sultanbeyli 

 Gediktaş Anadolu İmam Hatip Lisesi
 Hüsnü Mehmet Özyeğin Anadolu Lisesi
 Orhangazi Lisesi
 Özel Altınay Lisesi ve Anadolu Lisesi
 Özel Atılım Akşam Lisesi
 Özel Bilgi Çağı Lisesi
 Özel Sultanbeyli Akşam Lisesi

 Sabiha Gökçen Teknik ve Endüstri Meslek Lisesi
 Sultanbeyli Anadolu Sağlık Meslek Lisesi
 Sultanbeyli Kız Teknik ve Meslek Lisesi
 Sultanbeyli Lisesi
 Sultanbeyli Teknik ve Endüstri Meslek Lisesi
 Turhan Feyzioğlu Ticaret Meslek Lisesi
 Türk Telekom Anadolu Lisesi

Sultangazi 
 Atatürk Mesleki ve Teknik Anadolu Lisesi
 Cumhuriyet Anadolu Lisesi
 Mehmet Akif Ersoy Anadolu İmam Hatip Lisesi
 Şair Abay Konanbay Anadolu Lisesi
 Sultangazi Kız Teknik ve Meslek Lisesi
 Nuri Pakdil Anadolu Lisesi
 Prof. Dr. Fuat Sezgin Anadolu Lisesi
 Bahattin Yıldız Anadolu Lisesi
 Sultangazi Anadolu Lisesi
 Sultançiftliği Anadolu Lisesi
 Sultangazi Selahaddin Eyyüb-i mesleki ve Teknik Anadolu Lisesi
 Gazi çok programlı Anadolu Lisesi
 Habibler Anadolu Lisesi
 Hacı Ayşe Ateş Anadolu Lisesi
 Mehmet Yaşar Kandemir Anadolu İmam Hatip Lisesi

Tuzla 

 Behiye - Dr. Nevhiz Işıl Anadolu Lisesi
 Halil Türkkan Anadolu İmam Hatip Lisesi ve İmam Hatip Lisesi
 İMKB Anadolu Meslek ve Meslek Lisesi
 Kaşif Kalkavan Lisesi
 Mehmet Tekinalp Lisesi
 Orhanlı Lisesi

 Piri Reis Anadolu Denizcilik Meslek Lisesi
 Süleyman Demirel Anadolu Ticaret ve Ticaret Meslek Lisesi
 Tuğrulbey Lisesi
 Tuzla Anadolu Teknik, Teknik ve Endüstri Meslek Lisesi
 Tuzla Lisesi
 Yunus Emre Lisesi

Ümraniye 

 30 Ağustos Kız Meslek Lisesi 
 75. Yıl Cumhuriyet Lisesi 
 75. Yıl Cumhuriyet Ticaret Meslek Lisesi 
 Asım Ülker Çok Programlı Lisesi 
 Asiye Ağaoğlu Anadolu Lisesi 
 Atakent Lisesi 
 Atatürk Anadolu Teknik Lisesi, Teknik Lisesi ve Endüstri Meslek Lisesi 
 Eczacı Neşe Özlen Güray Anadolu Lisesi 
 Erkut Soyak Anadolu Lisesi 
 Namık Kemal Lisesi 
 Nevzat Ayaz Anadolu Lisesi 
 Özel Anabilim Lisesi 
 Özel Atlas Anadolu Sağlık Meslek Lisesi

 Özel Eyüboğlu Fen Lisesi 
 Özel Eyüboğlu Lisesi 
 Özel Gökkuşağı Anadolu Lisesi 
 Özel Gökkuşağı Koleji 
 Özel İrfan Lisesi 
 Özel Kapı Uluslararası Okulu 
 Türkiye Çimento Müstahsilleri Teknik Ve Endüstri Meslek Lisesi 
 Ümraniye Anadolu İmam-Hatip Lisesi ve İmam-Hatip Lisesi  
 Ümraniye Anadolu Lisesi 
 Ümraniye Kız Teknik ve Meslek Lisesi 
 Ümraniye Lisesi 
 Ümraniye Ticaret Meslek Lisesi

Üsküdar 

 Burhan Felek Lisesi
 Çağrıbey Anadolu Lisesi
 Çamlıca Kız Anadolu Lisesi
 Çengelköy Lisesi
 Hacı Sabancı Anadolu Lisesi
 Halide Edip Adıvar Anadolu Lisesi
 Haydarpaşa Anadolu Lisesi
 Haydarpaşa Anadolu Teknik Anadolu Meslek Teknik ve Endüstri Meslek Lisesi
 Haydarpaşa Bülent Akarcalı Sağlık Meslek Lisesi
 Henza Akın Çolakoğlu Lisesi
 Hüseyin Avni Sözen Anadolu Lisesi
 Kandilli Kız Anadolu Lisesi
 Kuleli Askeri Lisesi
 Mithatpaşa Anadolu Kız Meslek ve Kız Meslek Lisesi
 Özel Arda Asalet Lisesi
 Özel Asfa Ahmet Mithat Lisesi
 Özel Asfa Fen Lisesi
 Özel Bilfen Lisesi
 Özel Biltek Lisesi
 Özel Derya Öncü Lisesi
 Özel Erdil Lisesi

 Özel İstanbul Fen Lisesi
 Özel İSTEK Belde Fen Lisesi
 Özel İSTEK Belde Lisesi
 Özel Sevgi Çiçeği Anafen Fen Lisesi
 Özel Sevgi Çiçeği Anafen Gaye Lisesi
 Özel Surp Haç Ermeni Lisesi
 Özel Üsküdar Akşam Lisesi
 Özel Üsküdar Amerikan Lisesi
 Özel Üsküdar Bağlarbaşı Lisesi
 Özel Üsküdar Fen Lisesi
 Selimiye Tarım Meslek Lisesi
 Şeyh Şamil Lisesi
 Üsküdar Ahmet Keleşoğlu Anadolu Lisesi
 Üsküdar Anadolu İmam Hatip Lisesi ve İmam Hatip Lisesi
 Üsküdar Anadolu Ticaret ve Ticaret Meslek Lisesi
 Üsküdar Cumhuriyet Anadolu Kız Meslek ve Kız Meslek Lisesi
 Üsküdar Cumhuriyet Lisesi
 Üsküdar İMKB Anadolu Kız Meslek ve Kız Meslek Lisesi
 Üsküdar Lisesi
 Validebağ Anadolu Sağlık Meslek Lisesi
 Zeynep Kamil Sağlık Meslek Lisesi

Zeytinburnu 

 100. Yıl Ticaret Meslek Lisesi
 Adile Mermerci Anadolu Lisesi
 Adnan Menderes Anadolu Lisesi
 Haluk Ündeğer Anadolu Lisesi
 İhsan Mermerci Lisesi
 İMKB Kız Teknik Meslek Lisesi
 Kırımlı İsmail Rüştü Olcay Anadolu Lisesi
 Mehmet İhsan Mermerci Otelcilik ve Turizm Meslek Lisesi
 Mensucat Santral Anadolu Lisesi

 Özel Avrupa Koleji
 Özel Topkapı Fetih Fen Lisesi
 Özel Topkapı Fetih Koleji
 Şehit Büyükelçi Galip Balkar Teknik ve Endüstri Meslek Lisesi
 TRİSAD Kız Teknik Meslek Lisesi
 Zeytinburnu Anadolu İmam Hatip Lisesi
 Zeytinburnu Teknik ve Endüstri Meslek Lisesi
 Zühtü Kurtulmuş Lisesi

See also

Education in Istanbul
Istanbul-related lists
Istanbul